Mobula is a genus of rays in the family Mobulidae that is found worldwide in tropical and warm, temperate seas. Some authorities consider this to be a subfamily of the Myliobatidae (eagle rays). Their appearance is similar to that of manta rays, which are in the same family, and based on genetic and morphological evidence, the mantas belong in Mobula (they are traditionally in their own genus Manta). Species of this genus are often collectively referred to as "devil rays", "flying mobula", or simply "flying rays", due to their propensity for breaching, sometimes in a spectacular manner. These rays gather in groups and leap out of the surface into the air up to around two metres before splashing back into the water.

Despite their size, little is known about the devil rays, much of it anecdotal; the manta rays are better known. Most species entirely lack a tail stinger. In most species having a stinger, it is encased, rendering it harmless; only M. mobular has a "free" stinger.

Taxonomy
The genus is named by Constantine Samuel Rafinesque in 1810 describing the devil fish, Raia mobular or now Mobula mobular. The name can be explained from Latin mobilis "mobile" or "movable", because of the species' migratory habits; another explanation is that mobula is a local name used by people living in Azores who call this creature there.

Based on genetics and, to a lesser degree, morphological evidence, the genus was redefined in 2017. Under this arrangement, Manta is included in Mobula.

FishBase recognizes 11 species:
 Mobula alfredi (J. L. G. Krefft, 1868) (reef manta ray)
 Mobula birostris (Walbaum, 1792) (giant oceanic manta ray)
 Mobula eregoodootenkee Bleeker, 1859 (pygmy devil ray)
 Mobula hypostoma Bancroft, 1831 (lesser devil ray)
 Mobula japanica J. P. Müller & Henle, 1841 (spinetail mobula)
 Mobula kuhlii J. P. Müller & Henle, 1841 (shortfin devil ray)
 Mobula mobular Bonnaterre, 1788 (devil fish)
 Mobula munkiana Notarbartolo di Sciara, 1987 (Munk's devil ray)
 Mobula rochebrunei Vaillant, 1879 (lesser Guinean devil ray)
 Mobula tarapacana Philippi {Krumweide}, 1892 (Chilean devil ray)
 Mobula thurstoni Lloyd, 1908 (bentfin devil ray)

Extinct species by Shark-References:

 Mobula cappettae JONET, 1976
 Mobula fragilis (CAPPETTA, 1970) 
 Mobula lorenzolizanoi LAURITO MORA, 1999
 Mobula loupianensis CAPPETTA, 1970 
 Mobula melanyae (CASE, 1980) 
 Mobula pectinata CAPPETTA, 1970

Gallery

See also
 List of prehistoric cartilaginous fish

References

External links
Videos and information about several Mobula species — ARKive.org

 
Extant Rupelian first appearances
Ray genera
Taxa named by Constantine Samuel Rafinesque
Rupelian genus first appearances